Funa may refer to:
 Cyclone Funa,  the strongest cyclone of 2008 within the South Pacific
 Dennis B. Funa, a Filipino lawyer
 Funa (gastropod), a genus of sea snails in the family Pseudomelatomidae
 Funa (mountain), the medieval name of Demerdzhi Mountain in the Alushta Municipality, Crimea; see Valley of Ghosts (Crimea)
 Funa District, an administrative area of the city of Kinshasa, Democratic Republic of the Congo   
 Funa Futi, an atoll that forms the capital of the island nation of Tuvalu
 Funa-yurei, the ghosts of people who have died at sea